The Bityug is a river in Voronezh Oblast, Russia, a left tributary of the Don. Its upper reaches are located in Tambov Oblast. There are more than 400 lakes in the Bityug basin. The river freezes up in mid-December and stays icebound until late March or early April.

References

Rivers of Voronezh Oblast
Rivers of Tambov Oblast